The Kings Are Here is the debut Canadian studio album by The Kings, released in 1980 and certified Platinum in 2021. Its first two tracks, "This Beat Goes On" and "Switchin' to Glide", are usually played together and reached #59 on the RPM singles chart.

Track listing

References

1980 debut albums
The Kings albums